PJ Liguori (born 11 December 1990) is a British-Italian YouTuber and film producer. He is best known for his YouTube channel KickThePj. Liguori specializes in many different artistic areas including screenplay, directing, songwriting, creating props, acting, producing, editing, sound, art, animation, 3D modelling, crafts, writing, and costume. His most notable works include the comedy fantasy web series Oscar's Hotel for Fantastical Creatures, "Colour Bandits" and "The Forever Train".

Early and personal life
Liguori was born in Peterborough, Cambridgeshire, England to an Italian family. He has a sister.

Growing up, Liguori was interested in Drama and made home videos with his friends. He took a gap year before going on to graduate with a Bachelor of Arts with Honours in Digital Film and Screen Arts in 2013 from the University for the Creative Arts in Farnham, Surrey. It was here he met other creatives Sophie Newton, Jamie Swarbrick, and Louis Grant.

Liguori became a British citizen in March 2015 and he is based in Brighton.

Career
Liguori uploaded his first video, which featured him playing guitar, in early 2007 at the age of 16.

On 7 October 2011, Liguori released an album titled Stories from Somewhere. The album is a collection of short stories told in song.

In November 2012, Liguori won a Virgin Media Award for his short film PJ, Tiny Planet Explorer. Liguori has also been awarded for Best Director for his film series Oscar's Hotel for Fantastical Creatures in the 2016 Streamy Awards. In October 2016, Ligouri was nominated for the British Online Creator Awards (BONCAs) as the British Creator of the Year. Liguori was also nominated for the BONCAs Series of the Year for his film series Oscar's Hotel for Fantastical Creatures but lost to Adrian Bliss.

Liguori appeared in two episodes of Benjamin Cook's twelve part web documentary series Becoming YouTube.

In 2018, Liguori staged two 'work in progress' live shows in his hometown of Brighton, revealing later that they were test shows for a planned live tour of the UK. In September and early October of that year, Liguori travelled to twelve separate cities with his show 'Space Trip', a live storytelling event based around the fictional planet Kazam and its dangerous inhabitants. The show featured three guest stars: Dean Dobbs, Bertie Gilbert, and Chris Kendall, all of whom have collaborated with Liguori in the past.

Liguori directed the 2019 music video for Dodie Clark's single, "Monster".

Filmography

Oscar's Hotel for Fantastical Creatures
In late 2014, Liguori partnered with New Form Digital to create a 10 minute short film pilot entitled Oscar's Hotel for Fantastical Creatures. The film follows a young man named Oliver who goes to visit his uncle's hotel, which turns out to host unusual guests: monsters. A particular monster suddenly wreaks havoc in the hotel, and Oliver – amongst newfound friends – conquer the beast. Liguori announced in April 2015 that Oscar's Hotel would be funded and picked up as a six-episode web series by Vimeo, entitled Oscar's Hotel for Fantastical Creatures. The series was produced by New Form Digital and The Jim Henson Company. The first episode of the web series aired on Vimeo on 15 September 2015, and one episode aired per week over the course of six weeks.

Colour Bandits 
In June 2013, Liguori released a video on his YouTube channel by the title Colour Bandits. This film depicts Liguori as a 'Colour Bandit' wearing all white and caked in white makeup. The film was developed by PJ Liguori, Sophie Newton, Jamie Swarbrick, and Louis Grant.

The Forever Train 
In October 2013, Liguori released a short 8 minute film entitled The Forever Train. This short film was created by PJ Liguori, Sophie Newton, Jamie Swarbrick, and Louis Grant. The film tells the story of a passenger (played by Chris Kendall) on 'The Forever Train', a train that travels through time. While on board, the passenger has humorous interactions with the fellow monsters and creatures as he tries to find his suitcase and ticket. Several YouTubers acted in this film, including Chris Kendall, Thomas Ridgewell, Daniel Howell, Phil Lester, and Dodie Clark.

Awards and nominations

References

Further reading
 "PJ Liguori: YouTube star had an 'amazing' experience working with Sir Patrick Stewart in Oscar's Hotel". International Business Times.

External links
 

1990 births
Living people
Alumni of the University for the Creative Arts
British filmmakers
English people of Italian descent
English video bloggers
English YouTubers
Italian YouTubers
People from Peterborough